Henry Wilfred Brolemann (10 July 1860 – 31 July 1933)  was a French myriapodologist and former president of the Société entomologique de France known for major works on centipedes and millipedes, of which he named some 500 species. Brolemann was born on 10 July 1860 in Paris, to a wealthy family of Israelite industrialists and bankers that had long since converted to Protestantism. He  graduated from the University of Paris and was in the banking business early in life, then left for studies in the United States, including at Indiana University, and then studied in Italy before returning to France and becoming one of the world's experts in myriapods. Brolemann was fluent in English, German and Italian, and wrote in Spanish and Portuguese.

References

External links
List of Brolemann's publications on myriapods from the International Society of Myriapodology

1860 births
1933 deaths
Myriapodologists
French entomologists
Presidents of the Société entomologique de France
Scientists from Paris
19th-century French zoologists
20th-century French zoologists
University of Paris alumni
People from Béarn